Hum Hain Rahi Pyar Ke is a 1993 Indian romantic comedy-drama film, directed by Mahesh Bhatt and produced by Tahir Hussain, with screenplay written by Aamir Khan and Robin Bhatt, and with a musical score by Nadeem-Shravan. It stars Aamir Khan and Juhi Chawla in the lead roles, with Sharokh Bharucha and Kunal Khemu in supporting roles. Upon release, the film received positive reviews from critics, with particular praise directed towards Chawla's performance, for which she won the Filmfare Award for Best Actress at the 39th Filmfare Awards. The film has also garnered the National Film Award – Special Jury Award / Special Mention (Feature Film), and the Filmfare Award for Best Film. The film's plot is heavily inspired by the 1958 film House Boat. The film was remade in Telugu as Bhale Maavayya starring Suman.

Plot
Rahul Malhotra is the caretaker of a garment company that has a pending order of one lakh shirts to Mr Bijlani. Rahul is also the guardian of his deceased sister's mischievous kids: Sunny, Munni, and Vicky. He finds it hard to control the kids, as he is new to this. When the kids cause trouble, Rahul punishes them by locking them in their room. However, the children escape and head for a carnival in town.

Vyjayanti is the bubbly daughter of a South Indian businessman and music-lover. Her father wants her to marry Natarajan, a South Indian music legend, who is somewhat creepy. Vyjayanti refuses to marry him; as punishment, she is also locked up and escapes. She meets the three kids at the carnival and they become friends. Vyjayanti explains that she has no home so the children invite her to stay with them.

The children go to great lengths to hide Vyjayanti from Rahul. In a row of hilarious sequences, they are always one step ahead of Rahul before he can discover Vyjayanti. Two nights later however, Vyjayanti is revealed. Initially angry, Rahul sees that the children love her so he gives her a job as the children's governess. Vyjayanti begins to live with Rahul and the kids and slowly falls in love with him.

And then there enters seductive, glitzy Maya, Bijlani's daughter, who is obsessed with Rahul. She wants to marry Rahul, and Rahul approves, deciding that it would benefit the children. When Vyjayanti and the children find out about Maya and Rahul's upcoming engagement ceremony, Vyjayanti is heartbroken and the kids are upset, as they dislike Maya. On the day of the engagement, Vyjayanti explains to the kids that she loves Rahul and wants to marry him. The kids come up with a plan to stop the engagement. They crash the party with a dramatic act, which successfully postpones the engagement but angers Rahul. Back home, he scolds Vyjayanti and she admits that she loves him, shocking him.

The next morning, Bijlani comes with Maya to offer Rahul a second chance. Rahul defends Vyjayanti against their insults, thereby expressing his own love for her. The mischievous kids chase Bijlani and Maya out of the house with rotten eggs and tomatoes. As revenge, Bijlani and Maya set on auctioning Rahul's house. Rahul asks his workers to work overtime to make up for the shirt orders, which the supportive workers agree to. A successful two lakh shirts are made and loaded onto a truck to be delivered to Bijlani. Bijlani hires some thugs to ensure that the truck doesn't arrive on time. Much to their distaste, Rahul arrives on time with the order, and Bijlani and Maya are arrested.

Vyjayanti is reunited with her father, who disapproves of her marrying anyone outside the Iyer clan. All the factory workers, Rahul's colleagues, and the children ask him to allow Rahul and Vyjayanti to marry. With so much persistence, he accepts and Vyjayanti and Rahul are married in a South Indian ceremony.

Cast
Aamir Khan as Rahul Malhotra
Juhi Chawla as Vyjayanthi Iyer
Dalip Tahil as Bijlani, Maya's father.
Navneet Nishan as Maya Bijlani
K.D. Chandran as Mr. Iyer, Vyjayanti's father.
Veeru Krishnan as Natrajan Iyer 
Tiku Talsania as Advocate Homi Wadia
Mushtaq Khan as Bhagwati Prasad Mishra "Mishraji"
Javed Khan as Chhotya
Robin Bhatt as Host and Manager of East West Airlines.
Master Kunal Khemu as Sunny Chopra
Baby Ashrafa as Munni Chopra
Sharokh Bharucha as Vicky Chopra

Soundtrack
The soundtrack of the movie was composed by the music duo Nadeem Sharvan and lyrics were contributed by Sameer. Songs like 'Ghunghat Ki Aad Se', 'Kaash Koi Ladka Mujhe Pyaar Karta', 'Woh Meri Neend Mera Chain Mujhe' and 'Bombai Se Gayi Poona' became extremely popular. The song "Yunhi Kat  Jaayega Safar Saath" is based on  "Endhan Nenjil" from Kalaignan.

Box office
Hum Hain Rahi Pyar Ke was a 'superhit' at the box office. It was also one of the biggest hits of 1993. The performances of Juhi Chawla and Aamir Khan were critically acclaimed. Juhi Chawla became the box office queen of 1993, with multiple consecutive hit films like Lootere, Aaina, Shatranj, Izzat ki Roti & Darr becoming big box office successes, thus solidifying her career as the top actress of the 1990s.

Awards & nominations
41st National Film Awards:

Won
Special Jury Award – Mahesh Bhatt
Best Female Playback Singer  – Alka Yagnik for "Ghunghat Ki Aad Se"
39th Filmfare Awards:

Won
Best Film – Tahir Hussain
Best Actress – Juhi Chawla
Best Lyricist – Sameer for "Ghunghat Ki Aad Se"
Nominated
Best Director – Mahesh Bhatt
Best Actor – Aamir Khan
Best Music Director – Nadeem-Shravan
Best Female Playback Singer – Alka Yagnik for "Hum Hain Rahi Pyar Ke"

References

External links

1990s Hindi-language films
Films scored by Nadeem–Shravan
Hindi films remade in other languages
Films directed by Mahesh Bhatt
Special Mention (feature film) National Film Award winners
Indian romantic comedy-drama films
1990s romantic comedy-drama films
1993 comedy films
1993 drama films